The 1946 Bulgarian Cup was the 6th season of the Bulgarian Cup (in this period the tournament was named Cup of the Soviet Army). Levski Sofia won the competition, beating Chernolomets Popovo 4–1 in the final at the Yunak Stadium in Sofia.

First round

|}

Quarter-finals

|-
!colspan="3" style="background-color:#D0F0C0; text-align:left;" |Replay

|}

Semi-finals

|-
!colspan="3" style="background-color:#D0F0C0; text-align:left;" |Replay

|}

Final

Details

References

1946
1945–46 domestic association football cups
Cup